Is it Any Wonder? is a six-track EP by David Bowie that was released in early 2020. It is composed mostly of older Bowie songs that Bowie re-recorded during his Earthling (1997) recording sessions and Earthling Tour rehearsals in early 1997.

Background
Many of the tracks on the EP had not been released before. "Fun" came from the song "Fame", re-worked on Bowie's 1997 Earthling Tour as "Is it Any Wonder?". The song started with tracks recorded during pre-tour rehearsals in early 1997, supplemented with a live version of “Fame” recorded in June 1997, and then mixed by Mark Plati and Reeves Gabrels at Looking Glass Studios in New York and at Sony Music Studios in New York in February 1998. The track on this EP was remixed by Danny Saber. Prior to its release, the song was occasionally referred to as "Funhouse". An alternate remix of the song was released on LiveAndWell.com.

The mix of "The Man Who Sold the World" was originally released in 1995 as the b-side to Bowie's "Strangers When We Meet" single, but had not been released since. The mix was made from a recording of the band playing the track in the studio on 30 October 1995, to which Eno "added some backing vocals and a sonar blip and sculpted the piece a little so that there was more contour to it."

"Stay '97", an updated version of "Stay", released originally in 1976 on his album Station to Station, was recorded in 1997 at The Factory studios in Dublin and mixed in mid-1997. The Tin Machine track "I Can't Read" was re-recorded twice by Bowie in 1996, once for inclusion in The Ice Storm (1997) soundtrack, and once in this, Bowie's preferred form, for inclusion in the album Earthling, but at the last minute Bowie replaced it with the song "The Last Thing You Should Do." "Baby Universal '97", also originally by the band Tin Machine, was re-recorded for Earthling (to be slotted between "I'm Afraid of Americans" and "Law (Earthlings On Fire)", but was dropped from the album before its release. "Stay '97" and "Baby Universal '97" had not been released before.

"Nuts", a mostly-instrumental track by Bowie, Gabrels and Plati, was recorded in November 1996, and was intended as a bonus track, but was never released until this EP.

Release
In the build-up to the EP's release, tracks were available to stream, one per week, starting in January 2020. The entire EP was available via streaming services starting on 14 February 2020, and physical copies were made available to purchase in March 2020.

Track listing
 "Baby Universal '97" – 3:13
 "Fun (Clownboy mix)" – 3:11
 "Stay '97" – 7:30
 "I Can't Read '97" – 5:27
 "Nuts" – 5:21
 "The Man Who Sold the World (Live Eno Mix)" – 3:33

Personnel
Adapted from the Is It Any Wonder? liner notes.

"Baby Universal '97" (Lyrics: Bowie. Music: Bowie, Gabrels)
David Bowie – vocals
Zack Alford – drums
Gail Ann Dorsey – bass guitar; vocals
Mike Garson – keyboards; piano
Reeves Gabrels – synthesizers; guitars
Mark Plati – programming; keyboards

"Fun (Clownboy Mix)" (Bowie, Gabrels)
Danny Saber – mixing
David Bowie – vocals
Zack Alford – drums
Gail Ann Dorsey – bass guitar
Mike Garson – piano
Reeves Gabrels – guitars
Mark Plati – keyboards; programming

"Stay '97" (Bowie, Gabrels, Plati)
David Bowie – vocals
Zack Alford – drums
Gail Ann Dorsey – bass guitar
Mike Garson – piano
Reeves Gabrels – guitars; synthesizers
Mark Plati – mixing; programming

"I Can't Read '97" (Bowie, Gabrels)
David Bowie – vocals
Gail Ann Dorsey – bass guitar; vocals
Mike Garson – piano
Reeves Gabrels – guitars; synthesizers

"Nuts" (Bowie, Gabrels, Plati)
David Bowie – vocals
Reeves Gabrels – guitars
Mark Plati – mixing; programming

"The Man Who Sold the World (Live Eno Mix)" (Bowie)
David Bowie – vocals
Reeves Gabrels – guitars
Peter Schwartz – synthesizers
Carlos Alomar – guitars
Gail Ann Dorsey – bass guitar
Zack Alford – drums
Brian Eno – backing vocals

Production
David Bowie – producer
Reeves Gabrels – producer
Mark Plati – producer; engineer; mixing

Charts

References

External links
Discogs entry

2020 EPs
David Bowie EPs